Abraham Furnerius (1628–1654) was a Dutch Golden Age draughtsman and painter who was a pupil of Rembrandt.

Biography
He was born and died in Rotterdam. According to the RKD he was a Rembrandt pupil at the same time as Samuel van Hoogstraten, Philip de Koninck and Govert Flinck. Though he died young, he established a workshop and became the teacher of Gerrit Battem. He was the brother in law of Philip de Koninck, whose works are sometimes confused with his.

No extant paintings are securely ascribed to Furnerius. His surviving body of work consists of a large number of landscape drawings in ink or ink with wash.

References

Abraham Furnerius on Artnet

1628 births
1654 deaths
Baroque draughtsmen
Dutch Golden Age painters
Dutch male painters
Painters from Rotterdam
Pupils of Rembrandt